Armillaria pelliculata is a species of agaric fungus in the family Physalacriaceae. This species is found in Africa.

See also 
 List of Armillaria species

References 

pelliculata
Fungal tree pathogens and diseases
Fungi described in 1927
Fungi of Africa